Vinilkosmo is an independent record label in Donneville, near Toulouse, France. It only produces and distributes artists who sing in Esperanto.

History
Vinilkosmo was created in 1990 by Floréal Martorell in the framework of the Esperanto music association EUROKKA. In January 1999, Vinilkosmo separated from EUROKKA, and went professional. Since July 2009, Vinilkosmo has offered a legal download platform for most of the released albums on its website, Vinilkosmo-MP3.

Project Kolekto 2000
Vinilkosmo became famous in the Esperanto public with its project Kolekto 2000. It produced ten original high-quality albums in its own recording studio from 1998 to 2000:
JoMo kaj Liberecanoj 
Jacques Yvart kantas Georges Brassens
Persone : ...sed estas ne
Solotronik : Plimorfia Arkiteknia
Merlin : Por La Mondo
La Porkoj : Ŝako
Kajto : Masko
La Kompanoj : Survoje
Kore : Kia vivDolchamar''': Lingvo IntermondaSince then, the label has released numerous compilations and original productions, becoming one of the major actors in Esperanto culture.

Artists
Since its creation, Vinilkosmo has produced and/or distributed the following artists and groups:

 Akordo
 Alejandro Cossavella
 Amindaj
 Amplifiki
 baRok'
 Morice Benin
 Mikaelo Bronŝtejn
 Cantica
 Carina
 Alberta Casey
 Diablo
 DĴ Kunar 
 DĴ Rogxer 
 Dolchamar
 Duoble unu
 Esperanto Desperado
 Espo Despo
 Eterne Rima
 Thierry Faverial
 Flávio Fonseca
 Ralph Glomp
 inicialoj dc 
 Jonny M
 Jean-Marc Leclercq (JoMo)
 Vera Jordan
 Ĵomart et Nataŝa
 Kaj Tiel Plu
 Kajto
 Kapriol'
 Keĉka
 La Kompanoj
 Konga Espero
 Kore
 Krio de Morto
 Tarcísio Lima
 Lunatiko
 Magnus
 Martin kaj la talpoj
 Mayoma
 Merlin
 Meven
 La Mevo
 Nikolin'
 La Pafklik
 Patric
 Marcus Pengel
 La Perdita Generacio
 Persone
 Platano
 La Porkoj
 Miĥail Povorin
 Elena Puhova
 Ĵak Le Puil
 Rêverie
 La Rolls
 Rosemary's Babies
 Solotronik
 Kaj Stridell
 Strika Tango
 Supernova
 TEAM
 Tone
 Vigla Muziko
 Martin Wiese
 Jürgen Wulff
 Jacques Yvart
 Zhou-Mack Mafuila

 See also 

 Esperanto music

 External links 
  Vinilkosmo web site
 
 Vinilkosmo at MySpace Vinilkosmo at Last.fm''

Esperanto music
World music record labels
Record labels established in 1990